Mount Browning is a mountain,  high, which rises opposite the terminus of Boomerang Glacier in the Northern Foothills, on the coast of Victoria Land. It was first roughly mapped by the British Antarctic Expedition, 1907–09. This area was explored and mapped in greater detail by the Northern Party of the British Antarctic Expedition, 1910–13, and the mountain named for Petty Officer Frank V. Browning, Royal Navy, a member of the Northern Party.

References
 

Mountains of Victoria Land
Scott Coast